Erler is a German surname.

People 

 David Erler (born 1981), German countertenor
 Dieter Erler (1939–1998), German footballer 
 Dietmar Erler (born 1947), German footballer
 Fritz Erler (1868–1940), German painter and graphic designer
 Martin Erler, German philatelist
 Michaela Erler (born 1965), German handball player

Other 

 Erler, Bismil
 Erler Film, a Turkish movie production company established in 1960
 Karl Erler, the pseudonym of Heinrich Laufenberg

German-language surnames
Surnames